Henri Ernest Baillon was a French botanist and physician. He was born in Calais on 30 November 1827 and died in Paris on 19 July 1895.

Baillon spent his professional life as a professor of natural history, and he published numerous works on botany. He was appointed to the Légion d'honneur in 1867 and joined the Royal Society in 1894.

Baillon put together the "Dictionnaire de botanique", for which Auguste Faguet produced the wood engravings. The plant genus Baillonia (family Verbenaceae) was named in his honor by Henri Théophile Bocquillon.

Selected publications

 Étude générale du groupe des Euphorbiacées (1858)
 Monographie des Buxacées et des Stylocérée (1859)
 Recherches organogéniques sur la fleur femelle des Conifères (1860)
 Recherches sur l’organisation, le développement et l’anatomie des Caprifoliacées (1864)
 Adansonia, recueil périodique d’observations botaniques (12 volumes, 1866–1879)
 Histoire des plantes (thirteen volumes, 1867-1895)
 Dictionnaire de botanique (four volumes, 1876–1892)
 Histoire naturelle des plantes de Madagascar (three volumes)
 Traité de botanique médicale phanérogamique (1883-1884).

References

Botanists with author abbreviations
19th-century French botanists
1827 births
1895 deaths
Foreign Members of the Royal Society
Corresponding members of the Saint Petersburg Academy of Sciences
Members of the Royal Society of Sciences in Uppsala